Romina Cecilia Plataroti Francisco (born March 9, 1977) is a retired female gymnast from Argentina, who competed for her native South American country at the 1992 Summer Olympics. She won a bronze medal at the 1991 Pan American Games in Havana, Cuba.

References
sports-reference

Lic. en Psicología especializada en Clínica y Deporte ( Universidad de Buenos Aires )
www.rominaplataroti.com.ar

1977 births
Living people
Argentine female artistic gymnasts
Gymnasts at the 1992 Summer Olympics
Olympic gymnasts of Argentina
Pan American Games medalists in gymnastics
Pan American Games bronze medalists for Argentina
Gymnasts at the 1991 Pan American Games
Gymnasts at the 1995 Pan American Games
Medalists at the 1991 Pan American Games
20th-century Argentine women